William Henry Fletcher was a Welsh Anglican priest in the first third of the 20th century who rose to become Archdeacon of Wrexham.

Fletcher was educated at Shrewsbury and Christ Church. He was Curate of Holy Trinity, Shrewsbury from  1876 to 1878; Vicar of Criftins from 1878 to 1882; Vicar of Holy Trinity, Shrewsbury from 1883  to 1888; Vicar of Oswestry from 1888 to 1891; Vicar of Wrexham from 1891 to 1907; Rural Dean of Wrexham from 1891 to 1907; and Rector of Marchwiel from 1907  until his appointment as Archdeacon.

He died on 2 April 1926.

References

People educated at Shrewsbury School
Alumni of Christ Church, Oxford
Welsh Anglicans
Archdeacons of Wrexham
1926 deaths